The Old Florence Water Tower is a historic water tower in Florence, Alabama. It was built in 1889 by the Jeter and Boardman Gas and Water Association to increase water capacity in the town, which was undergoing a boom in population. It was replaced with a new tower in 1935. The tower was listed on the Alabama Register of Landmarks and Heritage in 1979 and the National Register of Historic Places in 1980.

References

National Register of Historic Places in Lauderdale County, Alabama
Water towers on the National Register of Historic Places
Buildings and structures completed in 1889
Buildings and structures in Florence, Alabama
Water towers in Alabama